Romanum decet Pontificem (named for its Latin incipit: "it befits the Roman Pontiff") is a papal bull issued by Pope Innocent XII (1691–1700) on June 22, 1692,  banning the office of cardinal-nephew, limiting his successors to elevating only one cardinal relative, eliminating various sinecures traditionally reserved for cardinal-nephews and capping the stipend or endowment the nephew of a pope could receive to 12,000 scudi.

Romanum decet Pontificem was later incorporated into the Code of Canon Law of 1917 in canons 240, 2; 1414, 4; and 1432, 1. In 1694, Innocent XII's series of reforms was capped off with an expensive campaign to eliminate the venality of offices while reimbursing their current holders.

However, following Romanum decet Pontificem, only three of the eight popes of the 18th century did not make a nephew or brother cardinal, and two of the three were members of monastic orders, that is without a family in the proper sense. 

The bull is available in Latin here: Innocentius XII, Papa. 1870. “Romanum decet Pontificem [...] Dat. die 22 iunii 1692, pontif. anno 1.” In Bullarium romanum (Volume 20): Bullarum diplomatum et privilegiorum santorum romanorum pontificum - taurinensis editio locupletior facta collectione novissima plurium brevium, epistolarum, decretorum actorumque S. Sedis a S. Leone Magnus usque ad praesens, edited by Francesco Gaude, Luigi Tomassetti, Charles Cocquelines, and Luigi Bilio, 441–6. Augustae Taurinorum: Seb. Franco et Henrico Dalmazzo editoribus.

References

External links
Transcript of Romanum decet pontificem

 
Christianity and law in the 17th century
1692 works
17th-century papal bulls
Documents of Pope Innocent XII
1692 in Christianity